The National Party of Australia – N.S.W., commonly known as "The Nationals"  or the NSW Nationals, is a political party in New South Wales which forms the state branch of the federal Nationals and has traditionally represented graziers, farmers, and rural voters generally. 

The party has generally been the junior partner in a centre-right Coalition with the NSW branch of the Liberal Party of Australia. Since 1927, the Nationals have been in Coalition with the Liberals and their predecessors, the Nationalist Party of Australia (1927–1931), the United Australia Party (1931–1943), and the Democratic Party (1943–1945). During periods of conservative government, the leader of the Nationals also serves as Deputy Premier of New South Wales. When the conservatives are in opposition, the Liberal and National parties usually form a joint opposition bench. New South Wales is the only state where the Coalition has never been broken (aside from a brief period in 2020), and yet has not merged into a unified non-Labor party.

History

Name changes
The movement began as the Progressive Party, from the 1922 split until 1925. It then used the name the Country Party until 1977, when it became the National Country Party. The party's name was changed to the National Party of Australia in 1982.
13 October 1919 – The Farmers' and Settlers' Association of New South Wales, the NSW Graziers' Association and the People's Party of Soldiers and Citizens meet as the first electoral council of the Progressive Party of New South Wales.
15 December 1921 – Split of the Progressive Party between urban and rural wings. Rural wing (known as the "True Blues") continues as the Progressive Party.
12 August 1925 – Michael Bruxner announces to the NSW Legislative Assembly that the party has changed its name to the Country Party of New South Wales.
24 September 1931 – In order to clarify its support for the New England New State Movement, the party name changes to the United Country Party of New South Wales.
9 February 1944 – The State Conference agrees to a further name change as the Australian Country Party (N.S.W.). 
26 June 1976 – The State Conference held in Broken Hill rejects a proposal to follow the federal party and rename itself as the "National Country Party of Australia – NSW".
26 June 1977 – The following State Conference held in Coffs Harbour approves the name change to the National Country Party of Australia – NSW.
26 June 1982 – The annual State Conference held in Wagga Wagga approves the name change to the National Party of Australia – NSW. The federal party does not make the same change until its Federal Conference on 16 October.
25 October 2003 – The NSW Central Council of the party approves the 11 October decision of the federal executive to use the term, The Nationals, in all state and federal election campaigns.

Government (2010s and 2020s)
As a measure of the Coalition's then-solidity in NSW, the Liberals won enough seats to theoretically govern alone during the Coalition's massive landslide at the 2011 state election. However, new Premier Barry O'Farrell kept the Nationals in his government.

Neo-Nazi infiltration
In 2018, the party revealed that approximately 30 members of its youth wing were being investigated for alleged links to neo-Nazism. Federal Nationals leader Michael McCormack denounced these attempts stating that: "The Nationals will not tolerate extremism or the politics of hate. People found to engage with such radicalism are not welcome in our party. We are a grassroots party proudly championing what matters most to our regional and rural communities – always has been, always will be". Several suspected neo-Nazis were expelled from the party and its youth wing. John Barilaro, the leader of the NSW Nationals, also denounced racism and fascism within the party stating that: "I have no problems calling this out, this is something I’m very strong on, I do not accept racism".

Planned move to crossbench
On 10 September 2020, the Nationals NSW declared that they would no longer support the legislation of the NSW Liberal Party, and would move to the crossbenches in Parliament. This was caused due to a new amendments to planning regulation which looked to class more forested area as koala habitat, restricting land clearing in such areas and increasing compliance for landowners, to which they disagreed with. On the morning of 11 September 2020, the Nationals backed down and rejoined the government.

Leadership

Leaders
People who served as the Leader of National Party of Australia in New South Wales are:

Deputy Leaders
People who served as the Deputy Leader of National Party of Australia in New South Wales are:

Election results

Notes

References

External links

Lists of political office-holders in New South Wales
New South Wales
Political parties in New South Wales